Nicholas Hyde (by 1489 – 1528), of Reading, Berkshire was an English Member of Parliament.

Hyde represented Reading in 1523 and was Mayor of Reading in 1522–23.

References

15th-century births
1528 deaths
People from Reading, Berkshire
English MPs 1523